Beam's Shell Service Station and Office, also known as C. Grier Beam Truck Museum, is a historic service station located at 117 N. Mountain St. in Cherryville, Gaston County, North Carolina.  It was built about 1930 by the Shell Oil Company, and is a one-story, rectangular Mission/spanish Revival style building. Associated with the service station are the original pump island and gasoline pumps.

It was listed on the National Register of Historic Places in 1997.

C. Grier Beam Truck Museum
The C. Grier Beam Truck Museum features historic trucks from the former Carolina Freight Carriers Corporation, which began in the historic gas station in the 1930s.  The company was bought out by the Arkansas Best Corporation in the 1990s. The museum also features early models of tractors and trailers, trucking and company memorabilia.  The museum building was constructed in 1987 adjacent to the gas station.

See also 
 Shell Service Station (Winston-Salem, North Carolina)

References

External links
Truck museum webpage

Transportation museums in North Carolina
Mission Revival architecture in North Carolina
Commercial buildings completed in 1930
Museums in Gaston County, North Carolina
Buildings and structures in Gaston County, North Carolina
Shell plc buildings and structures
Gas stations on the National Register of Historic Places in North Carolina
National Register of Historic Places in Gaston County, North Carolina